Asghar Hameed (born 1919 in Lahore; died 14 October 2002 in Lahore) was the fourth Emir of the Lahore Ahmadiyya Movement.

External links 
Biographie Asghar Hameed (engl.)

Emirs of the Lahore Ahmadiyya Movement
Pakistani Ahmadis
1919 births
2002 deaths